is a Japanese politician of the Democratic Party of Japan, a member of the House of Councillors in the Diet (national legislature).

Overview 
A native of Shiga Prefecture, she was elected for the first time in 2004.

References

External links 
 Official website in Japanese.

1972 births
Living people
People from Shiga Prefecture
Female members of the House of Councillors (Japan)
Members of the House of Councillors (Japan)
Democratic Party of Japan politicians
21st-century Japanese politicians